Henry Arthur "Patats" Cloete (15 June 1873 – 29 March 1959) was a South African international rugby union player. Born in Cape Town, he first played provincial rugby for Western Province. He made his only Test appearance for South Africa during Great Britain's 1896 tour. He played as a forward for the 4th Test of the series, a 5–0 win at Newlands Stadium. Cloete died in 1959, in Bulawayo, at the age of 85.

References

South African rugby union players
South Africa international rugby union players
Rugby union forwards
1873 births
1959 deaths
Rugby union players from Cape Town
Afrikaner people
South African people of Dutch descent
South African emigrants to Rhodesia
Western Province (rugby union) players